Strathcona was a territorial electoral district in the Northwest Territories from 1902 - 1905. In 1905 Alberta split from the North-West Territories. The provincial district of Strathcona district carried on from the old territorial district. It became Edmonton-South in 1913, then was abolished in 1921 when Edmonton started to elect its MLAs in one city-wide district (through Block Voting, then Single Transferable Voting). The "Strathcona" name was reborn in 1959 when Edmonton reverted to electing its MLAs in single-member districts (through First Past The Post). Under the name Edmonton-Strathcona it exists to the present day.

Election Results 1902

See also
Strathcona Alberta provincial electoral district
Strathcona Federal electoral district

References

Former electoral districts of Northwest Territories